Marutirtha Hinglaj (English: Hinglaj, the Desert Shrine) is a 1959 Indian Bengali-language drama film directed and produced by Bikash Roy. This was based on a same name travelogue of Bengali novelist Kalikananda Abadhuta. The film was made under the banner of Bikash Roy Productions and Janata Pictures and Theatres Limited. The lead actors are Uttam Kumar, Sabitri Chatterjee, and Anil Chatterjee. The music is by the Hemanta Mukherjee.

Plot
The plot revolves around a religious but dangerous journey towards the sacred temple at Hinglaj. A group of pilgrims undertake the long journey through the desert to reach the holy shrine where pilgrims can be washed of all their sins. The group rescue a dying couple, Thirumal and Kunti, who also join in the pilgrimage. While they walk hundreds of miles through the desert they face hardship and life-threatening challenges.

Cast
 Uttam Kumar as Thirumal
 Sabitri Chatterjee as Kunti
 Bikash Roy as Abadhoot
 Anil Chatterjee as Rooplal
 Pahari Sanyal as Popatlal Patel
 Chandrabati Devi as Bhairabi
 Shyam Laha
 Moni Sreemani

Production
The film was directed, produced and screenplay by Bikash Roy who also acted in the film. The film originally shooted in Digha. A desert was created on the beach sands near Digha. Bikash Roy brought two camels for use in the film. In ah highly dramatic moment, a mentally deranged Thirumal suddenly grabs Kunti by the throat. Uttam Kumar has been quiet since a few days that scene was taken. Uttam Kumar visions is quite unusual. When the scene shooting started Uttam pressed Sabitri's throat it was as if he was no longer himself. Sabitri was getting suffocated. Director Bikash Roy rushed after finishing the shot. Sabitri then has no sense, he vomited and passed out. After curing him with water, Bikash Roy scolded to Uttam Kumar. Then Uttam apologized to Sabitri. In the end of the film director was saved by four bottles of Bengali liquor. The film shooted also in Chakulia, two days in Ghatsila. Far way from Digha city the camera will capture the desert of Baluchistan on the sand.

Soundtrack

References

External links
 

1959 films
Bengali-language Indian films
Religious epic films
1959 drama films
Films based on Indian novels
1950s Bengali-language films
Indian drama films